Adarshgram tikarampur is a village located in the Mahauli panchayat of Munger district, Bihar state, India.

References 

Villages in Munger district